The Formosan golden tube-nosed bat (Harpiola isodon) is native to the high-altitude regions of Taiwan.

Taxonomy and etymology
It was described as a new species in 2006.
The holotype had been collected in Yuli Wildlife Refuge in Zhuoxi, Taiwan in 1998.
Its species name "isodon" means "equal-toothed."
The researchers who described the species chose this name because of the almost-equal basal area of the canines, first premolars, and second premolars.

Description
Its guard hairs have shiny, golden tips, inspiring its common name.
Its dorsal fur is very long, while the ventral fur is shorter.
Its fur texture is woolly.
Individual hairs are dark brown at their bases, bright yellow in the middle, and dark brown again at their tips.
Its uropatagium is densely furred both above and below.

Range and habitat
In 2006, it was published that the species had been documented in Vietnam for the first time.

Conservation
It is currently assessed as least concern by the IUCN.

References

Mammals of Taiwan
Mammals described in 2006
Bats of Asia
Murininae